Wunsiedel is a Landkreis (district) in the northeastern part of Bavaria, Germany. Neighbouring districts are (from the south clockwise) Tirschenreuth, Bayreuth, Hof, and to the east the Czech Karlovy Vary Region.

Geography
The district is located in the mountains of the Fichtelgebirge, with the highest elevation the 1051 m high Schneeberg. The river Ohře originates in the district.

History
In the Bavarian communal reforms of 1972 the district was merged with the previously district-free cities Marktredwitz and Selb, as well as parts of the dissolved district of Rehau.

Coat of arms
The coat of arms shows an eagle in the bottom left as the symbol of the city Marktredwitz, and a deer antler to the right as the symbol of the city Selb. In the top are the black-and-white symbol of the Zollern dynasty. The coat of arms was granted in 1974.

Towns and municipalities

References

External links

 Official website (German)

 
Districts of Bavaria